This is a list of birds of Victoria, Australia.

Victoria is Australia's second-smallest state but has high biodiversity, with 516 bird species recorded — around 54% of Australia's total of 959 bird species  in just 3% of Australia's land area.

Birds are present in high concentrations in some areas, including the Western Treatment Plant at Werribee in Melbourne's suburbs, which is a haven for tens of thousands of birds, due to a combination of permanent water, varied landforms and plant species.

Victoria contains a wider variety of natural habitats than any area of similar size in Australia. Habitats range from warm temperate rainforest in the far east of the state (East Gippsland), cool temperate rainforest, heathlands, mallee (stunted eucalypt) scrubland, grasslands, open woodland, montane forest, permanent lakes, estuaries, large permanent rivers, ocean and bay coastline. 4 million hectares of the state's 23.7 million hectare total land and marine area is protected in National Parks and conservation reserves.

Key locations
The state of Victoria includes the following 36 Important Bird Areas (IBAs) classified by BirdLife International:
 Anderson Inlet
 Australian Alps
 Barmah-Millewa
 Bendigo Box-Ironbark Region
 Bellarine Wetlands
 Carrum Wetlands
 Cheetham & Altona
 Corner Inlet
 Discovery Bay to Piccaninnie Ponds
 Devilbend Reservoir
 Gabo & Tullaberga Islands
 Gippsland Lakes
 Lake Corangamite Complex
 Lawrence Rocks
 Little Desert
 Lower Brodribb River
 Maryborough-Dunolly Box-Ironbark Region
 Murray-Sunset, Hattah-Kulkyne & Annuello
 Nadgee to Mallacoota Inlet
 Natimuk-Douglas Wetlands
 North Victorian Wetlands
 Otway Range
 Patho Plains
 Phillip Island
 Port Fairy to Warrnambool
 Puckapunyal
 Rushworth Box-Ironbark Region
 St Arnaud Box-Ironbark Region
 Swan Bay & Port Phillip Bay Islands
 Wandown
 Warby-Chiltern Box-Ironbark Region
 Werribee & Avalon
 Western Port
 Wilsons Promontory Islands
 Wyperfeld, Big Desert & Ngarkat
 Yambuk

Several sites in Victoria have been listed amongst Australia's top ten birdwatching locations including:
 Western Treatment Plant, Werribee, 40 km west of Melbourne 
 Mallacoota, East Gippsland, 513 km east of Melbourne 
 Dandenong Ranges 40 km east of Melbourne 
 Chiltern 290 km northeast of Melbourne 
 Hattah-Kulkyne National Park, Mallee (Victoria) 495 km northwest of Melbourne 

The following Victorian sites have been listed amongst Australia's top 100 birdwatching locations:
 Banyule Flats Reserve, Banyule, 20 km northeast of Melbourne 
 Phillip Island, South Gippsland, 142 km southeast of Melbourne 
 Gipsy Point, East Gippsland, 500 km east of Melbourne 
 You Yangs Regional Park, 60 km west of Melbourne 
 Port Fairy Pelagic, Port Fairy 288 km west of Melbourne 
 Bunyip State Park, West Gippsland, 86 km east of Melbourne 
 Serendip Sanctuary, 60 km west of Melbourne 
 Cabbage Tree Creek Nature Conservation Reserve, East Gippsland 408 km east of Melbourne 
 Tarra-Bulga National Park, South Gippsland, 193 km southeast of Melbourne 
 Little Desert National Park 373 km northwest of Melbourne 
 Wilsons Promontory National Park, South Gippsland, 213 km southeast of Melbourne 
 Sale Common Nature Conservation Reserve, Sale, East Gippsland 216 km southeast of Melbourne 
 Bronzewing Flora & Fauna Reserve, Ouyen Mallee (Victoria), 425 km northwest of Melbourne 
 Royal Botanic Gardens, Cranbourne 53 km southeast of Melbourne

Species

Ostriches 
Order: StruthioniformesFamily: Struthionidae

 Common ostrich, Struthio camelus – introduced species

Emus 

Order: CasuariformesFamily: Casuariidae

 Emu, Dromaius novaehollandiae

Magpie goose 

Order: AnseriformesFamily: Anseranatidae

 Magpie goose, Anseranas semipalmata – introduced species

Ducks, geese and swans 

Order: AnseriformesFamily: Anatidae

 Plumed whistling duck, Dendrocygna eytoni
 Wandering whistling duck, Dendrocygna arcuata
 Blue-billed duck, Oxyura australis
 Pink-eared duck, Malacorhynchus membranaceus
 Cape Barren goose, Cereopsis novaehollandiae
 Black swan, Cygnus atratus
 Greylag goose, Anser anser – introduced species
 Australian shelduck, Tadorna tadornoides
 Hardhead, Aythya australis
 Garganey, Spatula querquedula 
 Australasian shoveller, Spatula rhynchotis
 Northern shoveller, Spatula clypeata
 Pacific black duck, Anas superciliosa
 Mallard, Anas platyrhynchos – introduced species
 Grey teal, Anas gracilis
 Chestnut teal, Anas castanea
 Freckled duck, Stictonetta naevosa
 Musk duck, Biziura lobata
 Australian wood (maned) duck, Chenonetta jubata
 Asian (cotton) pygmy goose, Nettapus coromandelianus

Mound-builders 
Order: GalliformesFamily: Megapodiidae

 Malleefowl, Leipoa ocellata

New World quail 
Order: GalliformesFamily: Odontophoridae

 California quail, Callipepla californica – introduced species

pheasants and quail 
Order: GalliformesFamily: Phasianidae

 Stubble quail, Coturnix pectoralis
 Brown quail, Synoicus ypsilophorus
 King (blue-breasted) quail, Synoicus chinensis
 Common (ring-necked) pheasant, Phasianus colchicus – introduced species

Grebes 
Order: PhoenicopteriformesFamily: Podicipedidae

 Australasian grebe, Tachybaptus novaehollandiae
 Hoary-headed grebe, Poliocephalus poliocephalus
 Great crested grebe, Podiceps cristatus

Pigeons and doves 
Order: ColumbiformesFamily: Columbidae

 Rock dove, Columba livia – introduced species
 White-headed pigeon, Columba leucomela
 African collared (Barbary) dove, Streptopelia roseogrisea – introduced species
 Spotted-necked dove, Streptopelia chinensis – introduced species
 Brown cuckoo dove, Macropygia amboinensis
 Wonga pigeon, Leucosarcia melanoleuca
 Common bronzewing, Phaps chalcoptera
 Brush bronzewing, Phaps elegans
 Crested pigeon, Ocyphaps lophotes
 Diamond dove, Geopelia cuneata
 Peaceful dove, Geopelia placida
 Bar-shouldered dove, Geopelia humeralis
 Emerald dove, Chalcophaps indica
 Superb fruit dove, Ptilinopus superbus
 Rose-crowned fruit dove, Ptilinopus regina
 Topknot pigeon, Lopholaimus antarcticus

Tropicbirds 
Order: PhaethontiformesFamily: Phaethontidae

 Red-tailed tropicbird, Phaethon rubricauda
 White-tailed tropicbird, Phaethon lepturus

Frogmouths 
Order: CaprimulgiformesFamily: Podargidae

 Tawny frogmouth, Podargus strigoides

Nightjars 
Order: CaprimulgiformesFamily: Caprimulgidae

 White-throated nightjar, Eurostopodus mystacalis
 Spotted nightjar, Eurostopodus argus

Owlet-nightjars 
Order: CaprimulgiformesFamily: Aegothelidae

 Australian owlet-nightjar, Aegotheles cristatus

Swifts 
Order: CaprimulgiformesFamily: Apodidae

 White-throated needletail, Hirundapus caudacutus
 Fork-tailed swift, Apus pacificus

Cuckoos 
Order: CuculiformesFamily: Cuculidae

 Pacific (eastern) koel, Eudynamys orientalis
 Channel-billed cuckoo, Scythrops novaehollandiae
 Horsfield's bronze cuckoo, Chalcites basalis
 Black-eared cuckoo, Chalcites osculans
 Shining bronze cuckoo, Chalcites lucidus
 Fan-tailed cuckoo, Cacomantis flabelliformis
 Brush cuckoo, Cacomantis variolosus
 Pallid cuckoo, Heteroscenes pallidus

Rails, crakes and coots 
Order: GruiformesFamily: Rallidae

 Lewin's rail, Lewinia pectoralis
 Buff-banded rail, Hypotaenidia philippensis
 Australian spotted crake, Porzana fluminea
 Baillon's crake, Zapornia pusilla
 Spotless crake, Zapornia tabuensis
 Purple swamphen, Porphyrio porphyrio
 Dusky moorhen, Gallinula tenebrosa
 Black-tailed native-hen, Tribonyx ventralis
 Eurasian (common) coot, Fulica atra

Cranes 
Order: GruiformesFamily: Gruidae

 Brolga, Antigone rubicunda

Bustards 
Order: OtidiformesFamily: Otididae

 Australian bustard, Ardeotis australis

Penguins 
Order: SphenisciformesFamily: Spheniscidae

 Australian little penguin, Eudyptula novaehollandiae

Storm-petrels 
Order: ProcellariformesFamily: Oceanitidae

 Wilson's storm-petrel, Oceanites oceanicus
 Grey-backed storm-petrel, Garrodia nereis
 White-faced storm-petrel, Pelagodroma marina
 Black-bellied storm-petrel, Fregetta tropica
 New Zealand storm-petrel, Fregetta maoriana

Albatrosses 
Order: ProcellariformesFamily: Diomedeidae

 Royal albatross, Diomedea epomophora
 Wandering albatross, Diomedea exulans
 Sooty albatross, Phoebetria fusca
 Light-mantled sooty albatross, Phoebetria palpebrata
 Yellow-nosed albatross, Thalassarche chlororhynchos
 Grey-headed albatross, Thalassarche chrysostoma
 Black-browed albatross, Thalassarche melanophris
 Buller's albatross, Thalassarche bulleri
 White-capped albatross, Thalassarche cauta

Order: ProcellariformesFamily: Hydrobatidae

 Leach's storm-petrel, Hydrobates leucorhous

Fulmars, petrels and shearwaters 
Order: ProcellariformesFamily: Procellariidae

 Northern giant petrel, Macronectes halli
 Southern giant petrel, Macronectes giganteus
 Southern fulmar, Fulmarus glacialoides
 Antarctic petrel, Thalassoica antarctica
 Cape petrel, Daption capense
 Blue petrel, Halobaena caerulea
 Broad-billed prion, Pachyptila vittata
 Salvin's prion, Pachyptila salvini
 Antarctic prion, Pachyptila desolata
 Slender-billed prion, Pachyptila belcheri
 Fairy prion, Pachyptila turtur
 Fulmar prion, Pachyptila crassirostris
 Kerguelen petrel, Aphrodroma brevirostris
 Gould's petrel, Pterodroma leucoptera
 Cook's petrel, Pterodroma cookii
 Black-winged petrel, Pterodroma nigripennis
 Providence petrel, Pterodroma solandri
 Barau's petrel, Pterodroma baraui
 Mottled petrel, Pterodroma inexpectata
 Soft-plumaged petrel, Pterodroma mollis
 Atlantic petrel, Pterodroma incerta
 White-headed petrel, Pterodroma lessonii
 Great-winged petrel, Pterodroma macroptera
 Grey petrel, Procellaria cinerea
 White-chinned petrel, Procellaria aequinoctialis
 Westland petrel, Procellaria westlandica
 Black (Parkinson's) petrel, Procellaria parkinsoni
 Wedge-tailed shearwater, Ardenna pacifica
 Buller's shearwater, Ardenna bulleri
 Short-tailed shearwater, Ardenna tenuirostris
 Sooty shearwater, Ardenna grisea
 Great shearwater, Ardenna gravis
 Flesh-footed shearwater, Ardenna carneipes
 Streaked shearwater, Calonectris leucomelas
 Fluttering shearwater, Puffinus gavia
 Hutton's shearwater, Puffinus huttoni
 Little shearwater, Puffinus assimilis
 Bulwer's petrel, Bulweria bulwerii
 Common diving petrel, Pelecanoides urinatrix

Storks 
Order: PelecaniformesFamily: Ciconiidae

 Black-necked stork, Ephippiorhynchus asiaticus

Pelicans 
Order: PelecaniformesFamily: Pelecanidae

 Australian pelican, Pelecanus conspicillatus

Bitterns, herons and egrets 
Order: PelecaniformesFamily: Ardeidae

 Australasian bittern, Botaurus poiciloptilus
 Australian little bittern, Ixobrychus dubius
 Black bittern, Ixobrychus flavicollis
 Rufous (nankeen) night heron, Nycticorax caledonicus
 Striated heron, Butorides striata
 Cattle egret, Bubulcus ibis
 White-necked heron, Ardea pacifica
 Great egret, Ardea alba
 Intermediate egret, Ardea intermedia
 Pied heron, Egretta picata
 White-faced heron, Egretta novaehollandiae
 Little egret, Egretta garzetta
 Pacific (eastern) reef egret, Egretta sacra

Ibises and spoonbills 
Order: PelecaniformesFamily: Threskiornithidae

 Australian ibis, Threskiornis moluccus
 Straw-necked ibis, Threskiornis spinicollis
 Yellow-billed spoonbill, Platalea flavipes
 Royal spoonbill, Platalea regia
 Glossy ibis, Plegadis falcinellus

Frigatebirds 
Order: PelecaniformesFamily: Fregatidae

 Lesser frigatebird, Fregata ariel
 Great frigatebird, Fregata minor

Boobies and gannets 
Order: PelecaniformesFamily: Sulidae

 Cape gannet, Morus capensis
 Australasian gannet, Morus serrator
 Red-footed booby, Sula sula
 Brown booby, Sula leucogaster

Cormorants 
Order: PelecaniformesFamily: Phalacrocoracidae

 Little pied cormorant, Microcarbo melanoleucos
 Great cormorant, Phalacrocorax carbo
 Little black cormorant, Phalacrocorax sulcirostris
 Black-faced cormorant, Phalacrocorax fuscescens
 Australian pied cormorant, Phalacrocorax varius

Darters 
Order: PelecaniformesFamily: Anhingidae

 Oriental darter, Anhinga melanogaster
 Australasian darter, Anhinga novaehollandiae

Stone-curlews (thick-knees) 
Order: CharadriiformesFamily: Burhinidae

 Bush stone-curlew (thick-knee), Burhinus grallarius
 Beach stone-curlew (thick-knee), Esacus magnirostris

Oystercatchers 
Order: CharadriiformesFamily: Haematopodidae

 Australian pied oystercatcher, Haematopus longirostris
 Sooty oystercatcher, Haematopus fuliginosus

Avocets and stilts 
Order: CharadriiformesFamily: Recurvirostridae

 Banded stilt, Cladorhynchus leucocephalus
 Red-necked avocet, Recurvirostra novaehollandiae
 Black-winged stilt, Himantopus himantopus

Plovers and lapwings 
Order: CharadriiformesFamily: Charadriidae

 Grey plover, Pluvialis squatarola
 Pacific golden plover, Pluvialis fulva
 American golden plover, Pluvialis dominica
 Common ringed plover, Charadrius hiaticula
 Semipalmated plover, Charadrius semipalmatus
 Little ringed plover, Charadrius dubius
 Red-capped plover, Charadrius ruficapillus
 Double-banded plover, Charadrius bicinctus
 Lesser sand plover, Charadrius mongolus
 Greater sand plover, Charadrius leschenaultii
 Oriental plover, Charadrius veredus
 Hooded plover, Thinornis cucullatus
 Black-fronted dotterel, Elseyornis melanops
 Banded (black-breasted) lapwing, Vanellus tricolor
 Masked lapwing, Vanellus miles
 Red-kneed dotterel, Erythrogonys cinctus
 Inland dotterel, Peltohyas australis

Plains-wanderer 
Order: CharadriiformesFamily: Pedionomidae

 Plains-wanderer, Pedionomus torquatus

Painted-snipe 
Order: CharadriiformesFamily: Rostratulidae

 Australian painted-snipe, Rostratula australis

Waders or shorebirds 
Order: CharadriiformesFamily: Scolopacidae

 Whimbrel, Numenius phaeopus
 Little curlew, Numenius minutus
 Far Eastern curlew, Numenius madagascariensis
 Bar-tailed godwit, Limosa lapponica
 Hudsonian godwit, Limosa haemastica
 Black-tailed godwit, Limosa limosa
 Ruddy turnstone, Arenaria interpres
 Great knot, Calidris tenuirostris
 Red knot, Calidris canutus
 Ruff, Calidris pugnax
 Broad-billed sandpiper, Calidris falcinellus
 Sharp-tailed sandpiper, Calidris acuminata
 Stilt sandpiper, Calidris himantopus
 Curlew sandpiper, Calidris ferruginea
 Long-toed stint, Calidris subminuta
 Red-necked stint, Calidris ruficollis
 Sanderling, Calidris alba
 Baird's sandpiper, Calidris bairdii
 Little stint, Calidris minuta
 White-rumped sandpiper, Calidris fuscicollis
 Buff-breasted sandpiper, Calidris subruficollis
 Pectoral sandpiper, Calidris melanotos
 Asian dowitcher, Limnodromus semipalmatus
 Short-billed dowitcher, Limnodromus griseus
 Long-billed dowitcher, Limnodromus scolopaceus
 Latham's snipe, Gallinago hardwickii
 Terek sandpiper, Xenus cinereus
 Common sandpiper, Actitis hypoleucos
 Grey-tailed tattler, Tringa brevipes
 Wandering tattler, Tringa incana 
 Lesser yellowlegs, Tringa flavipes
 Spotted redshank, Tringa erythropus
 Common greenshank, Tringa nebularia
 Common redshank, Tringa totanus
 Wood sandpiper, Tringa glareola
 Marsh sandpiper, Tringa stagnatilis
 Wilson's phalarope, Steganopus tricolor
 Red-necked phalarope, Phalaropus lobatus
 Grey phalarope, Phalaropus fulicarius

Buttonquail 
Order: CharadriiformesFamily: Turnicidae

 Red-backed buttonquail, Turnix maculosus
 Painted buttonquail, Turnix varius
 Red-chested buttonquail, Turnix pyrrhothorax
 Little buttonquail, Turnix velox

Pratincoles 
Order: CharadriiformesFamily: Glareolidae

 Australian pratincole, Stiltia isabella 
 Oriental pratincole, Glareola maldivarum

Skuas 
Order: CharadriiformesFamily: Stercorariidae

 Long-tailed skua, Stercorarius longicaudus
 Arctic jaeger (skua), Stercorarius parasiticus
 Pomarine jaeger (skua), Stercorarius pomarinus
 South polar skua, Stercorarius maccormicki
 Brown skua, Stercorarius antarcticus

Gulls and terns 
Order: CharadriiformesFamily: Laridae

 Brown (common) noddy, Anous stolidus 
 Black noddy, Anous minutus 
 Grey ternlet (blue noddy), Procelsterna cerulea 
 Sabine's gull, Xema sabini
 Silver gull, Chroicocephalus novaehollandiae
 Laughing gull, Leucophaeus atricilla 
 Franklin's gull, Leucophaeus pipixcan
 Pacific gull, Larus pacificus
 Black-tailed gull, Larus crassirostris 
 Kelp gull, Larus dominicanus
 Sooty tern, Onychoprion fuscatus
 Bridled tern, Onychoprion anaethetus
 Little tern, Sternula albifrons
 Fairy tern, Sternula nereis
 Australian tern, Gelochelidon macrotarsa
 Caspian tern, Hydroprogne caspia
 Whiskered tern, Chlidonias hybrida
 White-winged black tern, Chlidonias leucopterus
 Black tern, Chlidonias niger
 White-fronted tern, Sterna striata
 Common tern, Sterna hirundo
 Arctic tern, Sterna paradisaea
 Antarctic tern, Sterna vittata
 Greater crested tern, Thalasseus bergii

Osprey 
Order: AccipitriformesFamily: Pandionidae

 Osprey, Pandion haliaetus

Hawks, kites and eagles 
Order: AccipitriformesFamily: Accipitridae

 Black-shouldered kite, Elanus axillaris
 Letter-winged kite, Elanus scriptus 
 Black-breasted buzzard, Hamirostra melanosternon 
 Square-tailed kite, Lophoictinia isura
 Wedge-tailed eagle, Aquila audax
 Little eagle, Hieraaetus morphnoides
 Swamp harrier, Circus approximans
 Spotted harrier, Circus assimilis
 Grey goshawk, Accipiter novaehollandiae
 Brown goshawk, Accipiter fasciatus
 Collared sparrowhawk, Accipiter cirrocephalus
 White-bellied sea eagle, Haliaeetus leucogaster
 Whistling kite, Haliastur sphenurus
 Brahminy kite, Haliastur indus 
 Black kite, Milvus migrans

Barn owls 
Order: StrigiformesFamily: Tytonidae

 Eastern grass owl, Tyto longimembris
 Greater sooty owl, Tyto tenebricosa
 Australian masked owl, Tyto novaehollandiae
 Barn owl, Tyto alba

True owls 
Order: StrigiformesFamily: Strigidae

 Forest eagle-owl, Bubo nipalensis 
 Powerful owl, Ninox strenua
 Barking owl, Ninox connivens
 Southern (spotted) boobook, Ninox boobook

Bee-eaters 
Order: CoraciiformesFamily: Meropidae

 Rainbow bee-eater, Merops ornatus

Rollers 
Order: CoraciiformesFamily: Coraciidae

 Dollarbird, Eurystomus orientalis

Kingfishers 
Order: CoraciiformesFamily: Alcedinidae

 Azure kingfisher, Ceyx azureus
 Forest kingfisher, Todiramphus macleayii
 Sacred kingfisher, Todiramphus sanctus
 Red-backed kingfisher, Todiramphus pyrrhopygius
 Laughing kookaburra, Dacelo novaeguineae

Falcons 
Order: FalconiformesFamily: Falconidae

 Nankeen kestrel, Falco cenchroides
 Australian hobby, Falco longipennis
 Brown falcon, Falco berigora
 Grey falcon, Falco hypoleucos
 Black falcon, Falco subniger
 Peregrine falcon, Falco peregrinus

Cockatoos 
Order: PsittaciformesFamily: Cacatuidae

 Cockatiel, Nymphicus hollandicus
 Red-tailed black cockatoo, Calyptorhynchus banksii
 Glossy black cockatoo, Calyptorhynchus lathami
 Yellow-tailed black cockatoo, Zanda funerea
 Gang-gang cockatoo, Callocephalon fimbriatum
 Galah, Eolophus roseicapilla
 Major Mitchell's cockatoo, Cacatua leadbeateri
 Long-billed corella, Cacatua tenuirostris
 Little corella, Cacatua sanguinea
 Sulphur-crested cockatoo, Cacatua galerita

True parrots 
Order: PsittaciformesFamily: Psittaculidae

 Superb parrot, Polytelis swainsonii
 Regent parrot, Polytelis anthopeplus
 Princess parrot, Polytelis alexandrae
 Australian king parrot, Alisterus scapularis
 Red-rumped parrot, Psephotus haematonotus
 Bluebonnet, Northiella haematogaster
 Mulga parrot, Psephotellus varius
 Crimson rosella, Platycercus elegans
 Eastern rosella, Platycercus eximius
 Australian ringneck, Barnardius zonarius
 Swift parrot, Lathamus discolor
 Eastern ground parrot, Pezoporus wallicus
 Night parrot, Pezoporus occidentalis 
 Blue-winged parrot, Neophema chrysostoma
 Elegant parrot, Neophema elegans
 Orange-bellied parrot, Neophema chrysogaster
 Turquoise parrot, Neophema pulchella
 Scarlet-chested parrot, Neophema splendida 
 Musk lorikeet, Glossopsitta concinna
 Little lorikeet, Glossopsitta pusilla
 Purple-crowned lorikeet, Glossopsitta porphyrocephala
 Rainbow lorikeet, Trichoglossus haematodus
 Scaly-breasted lorikeet, Trichoglossus chlorolepidotus
 Budgerigar, Melopsittacus undulatus

Lyrebirds 
Order: PasseriformesFamily: Menuridae

 Superb lyrebird, Menura novaehollandiae

Bowerbirds and catbirds 
Order: PasseriformesFamily: Ptilonorhynchidae

 Satin bowerbird, Ptilonorhynchus violaceus
 Spotted bowerbird, Chlamydera maculata

Treecreepers 
Order: PasseriformesFamily: Climacteridae

 White-throated treecreeper, Cormobates leucophaea
 Red-browed treecreeper, Climacteris erythrops
 White-browed treecreeper, Climacteris affinis
 Brown treecreeper, Climacteris picumnus

Fairywrens, emu-wrens and grasswrens 
Order: PasseriformesFamily: Maluridae

 Variegated fairywren, Malurus lamberti
 Superb fairywren, Malurus cyaneus
 Splendid fairywren, Malurus splendens
 White-winged fairywren, Malurus leucopterus
 Southern emu-wren, Stipiturus malachurus
 Mallee emu-wren, Stipiturus mallee
 Striated grasswren, Amytornis striatus

Bristlebirds 
Order: PasseriformesFamily: Dasyornithidae

 Eastern bristlebird, Dasyornis brachypterus
 Rufous bristlebird, Dasyornis broadbenti

Honeyeaters 
Order: PasseriformesFamily: Meliphagidae

 Eastern spinebill, Acanthorhynchus tenuirostris
 Pied honeyeater, Certhionyx variegatus
 Lewin's honeyeater, Meliphaga lewinii
 Singing honeyeater, Gavicalis virescens
 Grey-fronted honeyeater, Ptilotula plumula
 Fuscous honeyeater, Ptilotula fusca
 Yellow-plumed honeyeater, Ptilotula ornata
 White-plumed honeyeater, Ptilotula penicillata
 Yellow-faced honeyeater, Caligavis chrysops
 White-fronted honeyeater, Purnella albifrons
 Yellow-tufted honeyeater, Lichenostomus melanops
 Purple-gaped honeyeater, Lichenostomus cratitius
 Bell miner, Manorina melanophrys
 Noisy miner, Manorina melanocephala
 Yellow-throated miner, Manorina flavigula
 Black-eared miner, Manorina melanotis
 Spiny-cheeked honeyeater, Acanthagenys rufogularis
 Little wattlebird, Anthochaera chrysoptera
 Regent honeyeater, Anthochaera phrygia
 Red wattlebird, Anthochaera carunculata
 Crimson chat, Epthianura tricolor
 Orange chat, Epthianura aurifrons
 White-fronted chat, Epthianura albifrons
 Black honeyeater, Sugomel nigrum
 Scarlet honeyeater (myzomela), Myzomela sanguinolenta
 Tawny-crowned honeyeater, Gliciphila melanops
 Brown honeyeater, Lichmera indistincta
 Crescent honeyeater, Phylidonyris pyrrhopterus
 New Holland honeyeater, Phylidonyris novaehollandiae
 White-cheeked honeyeater, Phylidonyris niger
 White-eared honeyeater, Nesoptilotis leucotis
 Black-chinned honeyeater, Melithreptus gularis
 Brown-headed honeyeater, Melithreptus brevirostris
 White-naped honeyeater, Melithreptus lunatus
 Blue-faced honeyeater, Entomyzon cyanotis
 Little friarbird, Philemon citreogularis
 Noisy friarbird, Philemon corniculatus
 Striped honeyeater, Plectorhyncha lanceolata
 Painted honeyeater, Grantiella picta

Pardalotes 
Order: PasseriformesFamily: Pardalotidae

 Spotted pardalote, Pardalotus punctatus
 Striated pardalote, Pardalotus striatus

Scrubwrens, thornbills and allies 
Order: PasseriformesFamily: Acanthizidae

 Brown gerygone, Gerygone mouki
 White-throated gerygone, Gerygone olivacea
 Western gerygone, Gerygone fusca
 Weebill, Smicrornis brevirostris
 Pilotbird, Pycnoptilus floccosus
 Redthroat, Pyrrholaemus brunneus
 Speckled warbler, Pyrrholaemus sagittatus
 Chestnut-rumped heathwren, Calamanthus pyrrhopygius
 Shy heathwren, Calamanthus cautus
 Striated fieldwren, Calamanthus fuliginosus
 Rufous fieldwren, Calamanthus campestris
 White-browed scrubwren, Sericornis frontalis
 Large-billed scrubwren, Sericornis magnirostra
 Southern whiteface, Aphelocephala leucopsis
 Yellow-rumped thornbill, Acanthiza chrysorrhoa
 Yellow thornbill, Acanthiza nana
 Striated thornbill, Acanthiza lineata
 Inland thornbill, Acanthiza apicalis
 Brown thornbill, Acanthiza pusilla
 Slender-billed thornbill, Acanthiza iredalei
 Chestnut-rumped thornbill, Acanthiza uropygialis
 Buff-rumped thornbill, Acanthiza reguloides

Australasian babblers 
Order: PasseriformesFamily: Pomatostomidae

 Grey-crowned babbler, Pomatostomus temporalis
 White-browed babbler, Pomatostomus superciliosus
 Chestnut-crowned babbler, Pomatostomus ruficeps

Sittella 
Order: PasseriformesFamily: Neosittidae

 Varied sittella, Daphoenositta chrysoptera

Cuckooshrikes 
Order: PasseriformesFamily: Campephagidae

 Ground cuckooshrike, Coracina maxima
 Black-faced cuckooshrike, Coracina novaehollandiae
 White-bellied cuckooshrike, Coracina papuensis
 Common cicadabird, Coracina tenuirostris
 White-winged triller, Lalage tricolor

Quail-thrushes 
Order: PasseriformesFamily: Cinclosomatidae

 Spotted quail-thrush, Cinclosoma punctatum
 Chestnut (chestnut-backed) quail-thrush, Cinclosoma castanotum

Whistlers and allies 
Order: PasseriformesFamily: Pachycephalidae

 Olive whistler, Pachycephala olivacea
 Red-lored whistler, Pachycephala rufogularis
 Gilbert's whistler, Pachycephala inornata
 Rufous whistler, Pachycephala rufiventris
 Australian golden whistler, Pachycephala pectoralis
 Grey shrike-thrush, Colluricincla harmonica
 Eastern (crested) shrike-tit, Falcunculus frontatus

Crested bellbird 
Order: PasseriformesFamily: Oreoicidae

 Crested bellbird, Oreoica gutturalis

Whipbirds and wedgebills 
Order: PasseriformesFamily: Eupetidae (formerly Psophodidae)

 Eastern whipbird, Psophodes olivaceus
 Western whipbird, Psophodes nigrogularis
 Chirruping wedgebill, Psophodes cristatus

Figbirds and orioles 
Order: PasseriformesFamily: Oriolidae

 Australasian figbird, Sphecotheres vieilloti
 Olive-backed oriole, Oriolus sagittatus

Currawongs, woodswallows, butcherbirds and allies 
Order: PasseriformesFamily: Artamidae

 Pied currawong, Strepera graculina
 Grey currawong, Strepera versicolor
 Australian magpie, Gymnorhina tibicen
 Pied butcherbird, Cracticus nigrogularis
 Grey butcherbird, Cracticus torquatus
 Masked woodswallow, Artamus personatus
 White-browed woodswallow, Artamus superciliosus
 Dusky woodswallow, Artamus cyanopterus
 Black-faced woodswallow, Artamus cinereus
 Little woodswallow, Artamus minor
 White-breasted woodswallow, Artamus leucorynchus

Drongo 
Order: PasseriformesFamily: Dicruridae

 Spangled drongo, Dicrurus bracteatus

Fantails 

Order: PasseriformesFamily: Rhipiduridae

 Willie-wagtail, Rhipidura leucophrys
 Rufous fantail, Rhipidura rufifrons
 Grey fantail, Rhipidura albiscapa

Crows and ravens 
Order: PasseriformesFamily: Corvidae

 Little crow, Corvus bennetti
 Little raven, Corvus mellori
 Forest raven, Corvus tasmanicus
 Australian raven, Corvus coronoides
 House crow, Corvus splendens

Monarch flycatchers 
Order: PasseriformesFamily: Monarchidae

 Leaden flycatcher (myiagra), Myiagra rubecula
 Satin flycatcher (myiagra), Myiagra cyanoleuca
 Restless flycatcher (myiagra), Myiagra inquieta
 Magpie-lark, Grallina cyanoleuca
 Black-faced monarch, Monarcha melanopsis

Chough and apostlebird 
Order: PasseriformesFamily: Corcoracidae

 White-winged chough, Corcorax melanoramphos
 Apostlebird, Struthidea cinerea

Australasian robins 
Order: PasseriformesFamily: Petroicidae

 Rose robin, Petroica rosea
 Pink robin, Petroica rodinogaster
 Flame robin, Petroica phoenicea
 Scarlet robin, Petroica boodang
 Red-capped robin, Petroica goodenovii
 Jacky winter, Microeca fascinans
 Southern scrub robin, Drymodes brunneopygia
 Eastern yellow robin, Eopsaltria australis
 Eastern hooded robin, Melanodryas cucullata

Sunbirds and spiderhunters 
Order: PasseriformesFamily: Dicaeidae

 Mistletoebird, Dicaeum hirundinaceum

Australasian finches, firetails and waxbills 
Order: PasseriformesFamily: Estrildidae

 Beautiful firetail, Stagonopleura bella
 Diamond firetail, Stagonopleura guttata
 Red-browed finch, Neochmia temporalis
 Plum-headed finch, Neochmia modesta
 Zebra finch, Taeniopygia guttata
 Double-barred finch, Taeniopygia bichenovii

Old World sparrows 
Order: PasseriformesFamily: Passeridae

 House sparrow, Passer domesticus – introduced species
 Eurasian tree sparrow, Passer montanus – introduced species

Wagtails and pipits 
Order: PasseriformesFamily: Motacillidae

 Australian pipit, Anthus australis
 Eastern yellow (green-headed) wagtail, Motacilla tschutschensis
 White wagtail, Motacilla alba

True finches, crossbills and allies 
Order: PasseriformesFamily: Fringillidae

 European greenfinch, Chloris chloris – introduced species
 European goldfinch, Carduelis carduelis – introduced species

Larks 
Order: PasseriformesFamily: Alaudidae

 Horsfield's (singing) bushlark, Mirafra javanica
 Eurasian skylark, Alauda arvensis – introduced species

Cisticolas and allies 
Order: PasseriformesFamily: Cisticolidae

 Golden-headed cisticola, Cisticola exilis

Grassbirds, songlarks and allies 
Order: PasseriformesFamily: Locustellidae

 Brown songlark, Cincloramphus cruralis
 Rufous songlark, Cincloramphus mathewsi
 Tawny grassbird, Megalurus timoriensis
 Little grassbird, Megalurus gramineus

Reed-warblers 
Order: PasseriformesFamily: Acrocephalidae

 Australian reed warbler, Acrocephalus australis

Swallows 
Order: PasseriformesFamily: Hirundinidae

 White-backed swallow, Cheramoeca leucosterna
 Fairy martin, Petrochelidon ariel
 Tree martin, Petrochelidon nigricans
 Welcome swallow, Hirundo neoxena

Bulbuls 
Order: PasseriformesFamily: Pycnonotidae

 Red-whiskered bulbul, Pycnonotus jocosus – introduced species
 Red-vented bulbul, Pycnonotus cafer – extirpated

White-eyes 
Order: PasseriformesFamily: Zosteropidae

 Silver-eye, Zosterops lateralis

Starlings 
Order: PasseriformesFamily: Sturnidae

 European (common) starling, Sturnus vulgaris – introduced species
 Indian myna, Acridotheres tristis – introduced species

Thrushes and allies 
Order: PasseriformesFamily: Turdidae

 Bassian thrush, Zoothera lunulata
 Song thrush, Turdus philomelos – introduced species
 Eurasian (common) blackbird, Turdus merula – introduced species

See also
List of birds of Australia

References

Further reading
Bird Observations from eBird.org
Birdata from birdlife.org.au

Victoria
 
birds